Ginevra Elkann (born 24 September 1979) is a London-born Italian film producer and film director. She is a member of the Agnelli family and granddaughter of Italian industrialist Gianni Agnelli.

Early life 
Elkann was born in London, on 24 September 1979, the daughter of the Italian Margherita Agnelli and the French-Italian writer Alain Elkann. Her father is Jewish and her mother is Catholic, and she was raised Catholic. Her maternal grandparents were princess and socialite Marella Agnelli and the industrialist Gianni Agnelli. She is the great-grand-niece of Ettore Ovazza. She has two older brothers John Elkann, who is chairman of the Fiat group of companies, and Lapo Elkann. Her parents divorced when she was young, and she moved first to Rio de Janeiro and then to Paris with her mother and stepfather, the Russian count Serge de Pahlen. She graduated at the American University of Paris.

Career 
Elkann worked as third assistant director on Bernardo Bertolucci's 1998 film L'assedio, and was video assistant on Anthony Minghella's The Talented Mr. Ripley (1999). She later studied filmmaking at the London Film School (LFS), where she achieved her master's degree. In 2005, her LFS graduation film, the nine-minute Vado a messa (I Am Going to Mass), was screened during a Cinema Schools special event at the 62nd Venice International Film Festival. Asked whether she had any particular subjects in mind for a feature-length film, she mentioned two: a thriller set in the world of synchronized swimming, and an adaptation of her father's story Piazza Carignano, which concerns a fascist Jew. It is inspired by the story of her father's side of the family, the influential Ovazza banking family, who were early allies and important financial patrons of Benito Mussolini and Italian fascism.

In 2009, Elkann founded production company Caspian Films, first producing Frontier Blues, her debut feature film by Iranian director and fellow LFS graduate Babak Jalali. This film was developed with support from the Cinéfondation of Cannes and premiered in competition at the 62nd Locarno Film Festival. She then produced other independent feature films such as White Shadow, directed by Noaz Deshe (2013), which won the Lion of the Future award at the 70th Venice International Film Festival; Chlorine, directed by Lamberto Sanfelice (2015), which premiered at the 2015 Sundance Film Festival; and again with Jalali on his third feature Land, which premiered in the Panorama section at the 68th Berlin International Film Festival. 

In 2011, Elkann founded the production and distribution company Good Films, together with Francesco Melzi d'Eril, Luigi Musini, and Lorenzo Mieli. In 2019, her debut feature film as a director Magari (If Only) had its world premiere as the opening film at the 72nd Locarno Film Festival. Due to the COVID-19 pandemic in Italy, theatrical distribution of the film could not go ahead as programmed, so the film was made available on RaiPlay, the streaming platform of Italian national broadcaster RAI in May 2020. It was nominated for the best first film in 2020 and best new director in 2021 to the Ciak d'oro.

Personal life 
Elkann married Count Giovanni Gaetani dell'Aquila d'Aragona (born 1973) in a Roman Catholic ceremony in Marrakesh, Morocco, on 25 April 2009. She has two sons and a daughter with her husband; they were named Giacomo (born 15 August 2009), Pietro (born 31 October 2012), and Marella (born 27 May 2014).

Filmography

Director 
 Vado a messa (2005) – short film
 Magari (2019)

Producer 
 Frontier Blues (2009), directed by Babak Jalali
 Noche (2013) directed by Leonardo Brzezicki
 White Shadow (2013), directed by Noaz Deshe
 Chlorine (2015), directed by Lamberto Sanfelic
 Arianna (2015), directed by Carlo Lavagna
 Prova contraria (2016), directed by Chiara Agnello – documentary
 Mektoub, My Love: Canto Uno (2017), directed by Abdellatif Kechiche
 Land (2018), directed by Babak Jalali

Ancestry

References

Further reading

External links 
 2005 interview with Giovanni Bogani at Affaritaliani.it  
 2010 interview on Le invasioni barbariche at La7  
 2011 Interview on Le Regine at Rai3  
 2013 interview with Vogue Italia at YouTube  
 Ginevra Elkann at AllMovie 
 Ginevra Elkann at CineDataBase by Rivista del cinematografo  
 Ginevra Elkann at Filmportal.de 
 
 Ginevra Elkann at Vogue Italia  

1979 births
Agnelli family
Alumni of the London Film School
Film directors from London
Italian film directors
Italian film producers
Italian people of American descent
Italian people of French-Jewish descent
Italian people of Jewish descent
Italian Roman Catholics
Italian women film directors
Living people